Diacrisia is a genus of tiger moths in the family Erebidae. The genus was erected by Jacob Hübner in 1819. Its species can be found in Europe and Asia.

The species of the genera Rhyparia and Rhyparioides were placed in Diacrisia as a result of phylogenetic research published by Rönkä et al. in 2016.

Species
 Diacrisia amurensis (Bremer, 1861)
 Diacrisia aspersa
 Diacrisia aurapsa Swinhoe, 1905
 Diacrisia echo Rothschild, 1910
 Diacrisia irene Butler, 1881
 Diacrisia metelkana (Lederer, 1861)	
 Diacrisia nebulosa (Butler, 1877)
 Diacrisia porthesioides Rothschild, 1910
 Diacrisia purpurata (Linnaeus, 1758)	Purple Tiger
 Diacrisia sannio (Linnaeus, 1758)	Clouded Buff
 Diacrisia sublutea
 Diacrisia subvaria (Walker, 1855)

References

External links

Arctiina
Moth genera